John Grant   (11 August 1876 – 25 April 1961) was an amateur aficionado of the Great Highland bagpipe who, for over fifty years, composed piobaireachd and Ceòl Beag for members of the British Royal Family, important noblemen and women, and contemporary statesmen; wrote and published books on the Great Highland Bagpipe and its music; and taught students under the auspices of the [Royal] Scottish Piper's Society.

Early life
John Grant was the sixth child and fourth son of George Grant and Eliza (Elisabeth) Roy Grant, who resided in "The Bauds" on a hillside outside of the settlement of Kellas, near Dallas and Elgin, Scotland. At 17 years of age John left the farm for Elgin in order to begin a career in law. Within six months he obtained a position as a law clerk with Messrs. Stewart and McIsaac, Solicitors. Needing a hobby to occupy his leisure hours, he took up bagpiping, walking eleven miles one way twice a week to Gordon Castle in order to study with renowned Pipe-Major Ronald MacKenzie. By the summer of 1898, after only two years of study, Grant had become accomplished enough on the bagpipes to win the gold medal in a competition that fielded thirty-three entrants. In late August, Ronald MacKenzie recommended Grant to William Stirling-Home-Drummond-Moray, Laird of Abercairny (Crieff), who was seeking a full-time family piper for the Abercairny Estate. Grant accepted the position, serving in the post from October 1898 until May 1902.

The Royal Collection of Piobaireachd
Grant left the employ of the Laird in May 1902 in order to resume work in the legal profession.  He moved to Edinburgh, and became clerk to his old supervisor from Messrs. Stewart and McIsaacs, Mr. A.S. Stoddart, Leith. Shortly thereafter he took up employment as a cash clerk, overseeing the entire payroll operation of the North British Rubber Company, Edinburgh.   Grant married Mary Jane Harper (26 October 1869 – 13 December 1963) at Auchterless on 12 June 1903. The couple set up housekeeping for a time with John's spinster sisters at 5 Athole Place, then moved into their own apartment at 21 Murieston Crescent.

Perhaps as a requirement for his employment as a legal clerk, Grant became skilled in calligraphy. His bagpipe teacher, Ronald MacKenzie, had impressed upon Grant early on in his tutelage the importance of copying and preserving ancient piobaireachd  and Grant, as early as 1900, began compiling manuscripts of the "classical music of the bagpipe," for disseminating among those who were interested in them. Several such collections made their ways into the hands of members of the Highland Society of London and the newly-formed Piobaireachd Society.  Because of the praise these organizations lavished on Grant for his exquisite workmanship, he decided to try his own hand at piobaireachd composition. Combining his talent for calligraphy with his knowledge of piobaireachd, on 20 July 1906 he composed "His Most Excellent Majesty King Edward VII's Salute," then prepared it as a beautifully-illuminated presentation folio to lay before the King. Edward VII graciously accepted the tune dedicated to him, thereby, in essence, granting John Grant license to do the same for others among the Royal Family, the nobility, and those of renown whom he deemed worthy of such an honor. By September 1907 Grant had composed, prepared in illuminated manuscript, and sent for acceptance, five more "royal" piobaireachds, all of which were gratefully accepted, either by those to whom they were dedicated, or a representative. In May 1908, in order to make them available to the public, he published—at his own expense--The Royal Collection of Piobaireachd: Besides the "Salute" written in honor of King Edward VII, the work included "His Royal Highness The Duke of Connaught's Salute" (i.e., Prince Arthur, Duke of Connaught and Strathearn) "Lament For Her Most Excellent Majesty Queen Victoria,", "His Grace The Duke of Fife's Salute," "Lord Archibald Campbell's Salute," and "The Piobaireachd Society's Salute."  The work had over 160 subscribers, including those to whom the tunes were dedicated, other royals, and individuals from all walks of life, including such personages as Baron Strathcona and Mount Royal.

Grant considered the first edition so successful he published a second in March 1911, adding fifteen more tunes to the six of the first edition.  The additional tunes, in chronological order of composition, were:

Piobaireachd: Its Origin and Construction

Following successful publications of both editions of The Royal Collection of Piobaireachd, Grant decided to tackle the genre in a more comprehensive manner. The result was a 183-page volume entitled Piobaireachd: Its Origin and Construction.  published at the author's expense by Aird & Coghill, Limited, Glasgow sometime in August, 1915. Known also by its Gaelic title Tus is Alt à Chiuil-Mhoir, Piobaireachd: Its Origin and Construction (hereafter POC) had an impressive list of patrons and subscribers, including King George V and Queen Mary of Teck, Queen Alexandra of Denmark, the Prince of Wales , various other royals, nobles, and members of high society, and the Highland Society of London. 
The book received good reviews from Grant's contemporaries. Modern reviews, however, tend to be mixed. In his "Introduction" to the 1974 reprint of The Pipes of War, referencing POC, Major General Frank Richardson wrote:

This book cannot in all honesty be recommended today.  Some useful information for those who want to know about our instrument, its music and some Highland traditions and legends can be found there, but its good points are embedded in much indigestible matter, like currants in what our generation of Servicemen called a 'Nafty cake.'''

On the other hand, Pipe-Major Roger Huth (The Surrey Pipe Band), Vice President of the Scottish Piping Society of London, former member of the Scots Guards, and an esteemed piper, had much to praise about the book in a 2006 review:It is soon apparent when reading through the pages of his book, that John Grant was also a man of considerable intellect. His knowledge appears to be no shallow pool as he explains to his reader the poetry of Piobaireachd as well as how the MacCrimmon Clan and others through the years constructed their compositions. He also explains the theory of music as it appertains to the Scottish Bagpipe and I strongly suspect that those who created their own Bagpipe Schools during the 20th Century, including the Army at Edinburgh Castle, leant on this book heavily.''

Despite Grant's tendency to be overly Romantic in his prose, the book remains a classic.  The first of its kind, it still remains the largest compendium of articles on topics relating to the "National" music of Scotland in bagpipe literature.

References

External links 
 
 Piobaireachd: Its Origin and Construction

Great Highland bagpipe players
People from Moray
1876 births
1961 deaths
Scottish composers
Scottish writers about music
Fellows of the Society of Antiquaries of Scotland